, also known as Operation Heaven One (or Ten-ichi-gō 天一号), was the last major Japanese naval operation in the Pacific Theater of World War II. The resulting engagement is also known as the Battle of the East China Sea.

The Japanese force was attacked by U.S. carrier-borne aircraft before it could reach Okinawa; Yamato and five other Japanese warships were sunk.

The battle demonstrated U.S. air supremacy in the Asiatic-Pacific Theater and the vulnerability of surface ships without air cover to aerial attack. The battle also exhibited Japan's willingness to make extreme sacrifices in kamikaze attacks aimed at slowing the Allied advance on the Japanese home islands.

Background
By early 1945, following the Solomon Islands campaign, the Battle of the Philippine Sea and the Battle of Leyte Gulf, the once-formidable Imperial Japanese Navy's Combined Fleet was reduced to just a handful of operational warships and a few remaining aircraft and aircrew. Most of the remaining Japanese warships in the Combined Fleet were stationed at ports in Japan, with most of the large ships at the port of Kure in the Hiroshima Prefecture on the main Japanese island of Honshu.

As a final step before the planned invasion of the Japanese home islands, Allied forces invaded Okinawa on 1 April 1945. In March, when briefing Emperor Hirohito on Japan's response to the expected invasion of Okinawa, Japanese military leaders explained that the Imperial Japanese Army was planning extensive air attacks, including the use of kamikaze tactics. The emperor then reportedly asked, "But what about the Navy? What are they doing to assist in defending Okinawa? Have we no more ships?" Now feeling pressured by the emperor to also mount some kind of attack, Japanese Navy commanders conceived a kamikaze-type mission for their remaining operational large ships, which included the battleship .

The resulting plan—drafted under the direction of the Commander-in-Chief of the Combined Fleet, Admiral Soemu Toyoda,—called for Yamato and her escorts to attack the U.S. fleet supporting the U.S. troops landing on the western coast of Okinawa. Yamato and her escorts were to fight their way to Okinawa and then beach themselves between Higashi and Yomitan and fight as shore batteries until they were destroyed. Once the ships were destroyed, their surviving crew members were supposed to abandon ship and fight U.S. forces on land. Very little, if any, air cover could be provided for the ships, which would render them almost helpless to concentrated attacks from U.S. carrier-based aircraft. In preparation for executing the plan, on 29 March the assigned ships left Kure for Tokuyama, off the port of Mitajiri on the southern coast of Honshu. Despite obeying orders to prepare for the mission, the commander of the Ten-Go force, Vice-Admiral Seiichi Itō, still refused to actually order his ships to carry it out, believing the plan to be futile and wasteful.

Other officers of the Imperial Japanese Navy also had very negative views about the operation, believing that it was a waste of human life and fuel. Captain Atsushi Ōi, an operations officer at Grand Escort Command, was critical as fuel and resources were diverted from other operations. As he was told that the aim of this operation was "the tradition and the glory of the Navy," he shouted: "this war is of our nation and why should the honor of our 'surface fleet' be more respected? Who cares about their glory? Damn fools!".

Vice Admiral Ryūnosuke Kusaka flew from Tokyo to Tokuyama on 5 April in a final attempt to convince Itō and the assembled commanders of the Combined Fleet to accept the plan. Upon hearing of the proposed operation—which had been kept secret from most of them—the Combined Fleet commanders and captains unanimously joined Itō in rejecting it for the same reasons that he had expressed. Kusaka then explained that the Navy's attack would help divert U.S. aircraft away from the Army's planned kamikaze attacks on the U.S. fleet at Okinawa. He also explained that Japan's national leadership, including the emperor, were expecting the Navy to make their best effort to support the defense of Okinawa.

Upon hearing this, the Combined Fleet commanders relented and accepted the proposed plan. The ships' crews were briefed on the nature of the mission and given the opportunity to stay behind if desired; none did. However, approximately 80 crew members who were new, sick, or infirm, were ordered off the ships, including sixty-seven naval cadets of Etajima Naval Academy Class No. 74 who had arrived on the battleship three days earlier.  The ships' crews now engaged in some last-minute intense drills to prepare for the mission, mostly practicing damage control procedures. At midnight, the ships were fueled. Reportedly, in secret defiance of orders to provide the ships with only just enough fuel to reach Okinawa, the Tokuyama personnel actually gave Yamato and the other ships almost all of the remaining fuel in the port, although this probably still was not enough to allow the force to return to Japan from Okinawa. Yamatos executive officer organised a party for the crew for the evening of 5 April, during which many of the officers and sailors drank heavily.

The United States Navy was able to monitor preparations for Operation Ten-Go by decoding Japanese radio signals. Through this source, the Americans received conclusive intelligence on 5 and 6 April that the attack was to be attempted. The commander of the United States Fifth Fleet, Admiral Raymond Spruance, ordered his forces to prepare to attack the Japanese at 12:30 am on 6 April, before Yamato and her consorts sailed.

Prelude

At 16:00 on 6 April, Yamato (with Admiral Itō on board), the light cruiser , and eight destroyers (Asashimo, Hamakaze, Isokaze, Suzutsuki, Hatsushimo, Yukikaze, Fuyutsuki, and Kasumi) departed Tokuyama to begin the mission. Although they were unable to attack due to the ships' speed, they did spend several hours shadowing the Japanese sortie and sending updates on its course to the U.S. fleet. The submarines' messages, which were reportedly sent uncoded, were also picked up by radio operators on the Japanese ships.

At dawn on 7 April, the Japanese force passed the Ōsumi Peninsula into the open ocean heading south from Kyūshū toward Okinawa. One of the Japanese destroyers, Asashimo, developed engine trouble and turned back. U.S. reconnaissance aircraft began to shadow the main force of ships. At 10:00, the Japanese force turned west to make it look like they were withdrawing, but at 11:30, after being detected by two American PBM Mariner flying boats, the Yamato fired a salvo with her  bow guns using special , but could not prevent the two planes from shadowing the Japanese force. Then they turned back towards Okinawa.

Upon receiving contact reports early on 7 April, Spruance ordered Task Force 54, which consisted mostly of modernized Standard-type battleships under the command of Rear Admiral Morton Deyo (which were engaged in shore bombardment), to intercept and destroy the Japanese sortie. Deyo moved to execute his orders, but Vice Admiral Marc A. Mitscher, who commanded Task Force 58, preempted Spruance and Deyo by launching a massive air strike from his carriers, without informing Spruance until after the launches were completed. As a senior naval aviation officer, "Mitscher had spent a career fighting the battleship admirals who had steered the navy’s thinking for most of the current century. One of those was his immediate superior, Raymond Spruance. Mitscher felt a stirring of battleship versus aircraft carrier rivalry. Though the carriers had mostly fought the great battles of the Pacific, whether air power alone could prevail over a surface force had not been proven beyond all doubt. Here was an opportunity to end the debate forever".

Around 10:00 on 7 April, Task Groups 58.1 and 58.3 began launching 280 aircraft from their carriers to attack the Japanese force. Task Group 58.4 launched a further 106 aircraft. The aircraft consisted of F6F Hellcat and F4U Corsair fighters, SB2C Helldiver dive bombers, and TBF Avenger torpedo bombers. Overall, 15 carriers launched aircraft. The air groups launched from five carriers became lost in bad weather and were not able to attack. As a contingency, Spruance ordered Admiral Deyo to assemble a force of six fast battleships, seven cruisers and 21 destroyers to prepare for a surface engagement with Yamato should the airstrikes prove unsuccessful.

Battle

Around noon, the first American aircraft arrived over Yamato; these were F6F Hellcat and F4U Corsair fighters, under orders to deal with any Japanese aircraft that might appear to defend the below-mentioned ships, but none appeared. Once it became obvious that the Japanese force had no air cover, the U.S. aircraft could set up for their attacks without fear of opposition from Japanese aircraft. U.S. bomber and torpedo aircraft arriving over the Yamato group—after their two-hour flight from Okinawa— could circle the Japanese ship formation just out of anti-aircraft range to set up their attacks on the warships below methodically. The first wave of U.S. carrier planes was spotted by a Japanese lookout on the bridge at 12:32. Two minutes later, at 12:34, Yamato opened fire with her 460 mm main batteries. Yamato carried almost 150 anti-aircraft guns, including her massive 460 mm main guns that fired San Shiki anti-aircraft shells. The U.S. pilots deduced that the use of San Shiki and colored gunfire meant that Yamato's gunners relied on visual aiming and range, rather than being radar directed, and as a result "were missing with great consistency" despite the storm of fire that they put up.

The American F6F Hellcat and F4U Corsair fighters "were supposed to go first, to strafe, to rocket, to drop light ordnance, distracting the enemy gunners while the SB2C Helldivers plunged almost straight down with their heavy [armor piercing] bombs". This was because the TBM Avenger torpedo bombers "needed all the distraction and diversion they could get when they made their dangerous low altitude runs straight at the enemy ships." The Avengers mainly attacked from the port side so that if the torpedoes hit that side, it would increase the likelihood of the target ship capsizing.

At 12:46, a torpedo hit Yahagi directly in her engine room, killing the entire engineering room crew and bringing her to a complete stop. Yahagi was hit by at least six more torpedoes and 12 bombs by succeeding waves of air attacks. The Japanese destroyer Isokaze attempted to come to Yahagis aid but was attacked and heavily damaged and sank sometime later. Yahagi capsized and sank at 14:05.

During the first attack wave, despite evasive maneuvers that caused most of the bombs and torpedoes aimed at her to miss, Yamato was hit by two armor-piercing bombs and one torpedo. Her speed was not affected, but one of the bombs started a fire aft of the superstructure that was not extinguished. Also, during the first attack wave, Japanese destroyers Hamakaze and Suzutsuki were heavily damaged and taken out of the battle. Hamakaze sank later.

Between 13:20 and 14:15, the second and third waves of U.S. aircraft attacked, concentrating on Yamato. During this time, Yamato was hit by at least eight torpedoes and up to 15 bombs. The bombs did extensive damage to the topside of the ship, including knocking out power to the gun directors and forcing the anti-aircraft guns to be individually and manually aimed and fired, greatly reducing their effectiveness. The torpedo hits—almost all on the port side—caused Yamato to list enough that capsizing was now an imminent danger.

At 13:33, in a desperate attempt to keep the ship from capsizing, Yamatos damage control team counter-flooded both starboard engine and boiler rooms. This mitigated the danger but also drowned the several hundred crew members crewing those stations, who were given no notice that their compartments were about to fill with water. At that same moment, the Americans launched another 110 aircraft from Task Group 58. Twenty Avengers made a new torpedo run from 60 degrees to port. Yamato started a sharp turn to port, but three torpedoes ripped into her port side amidships, jamming her auxiliary rudder in position hard port.

With Yamato proceeding more slowly and therefore being more accessible to target, U.S. torpedo aircraft concentrated on hitting her rudder and stern with torpedoes to affect her steering ability, which they succeeded in doing. At 14:02, after being informed that the ship could no longer steer and was sinking, Admiral Itō ordered the mission canceled, the crew to abandon the ship and the remaining ships to begin rescuing survivors. Yamato communicated this message to the other surviving ships by signal flag because her radios had been destroyed.

Admiral Itō, along with Captain Kōsaku Aruga, who commanded Yamato for the battle, refused to abandon ship, with Itō retiring to the flag cabin while Aruga tied himself to the binnacle. As the order to abandon the ship was issued after the ship began to capsize, many of her crew were trapped. American aircraft continued to attack Yamato during this period, and she suffered several more torpedo hits. At 14:20, Yamato capsized completely and began to sink. Japanese survivor Mitsuru Yoshida said that her large explosion downed several U.S. planes observing her end. The explosion is believed to have occurred when the fires ignited by bomb hits reached the main magazines.

Attempting to make it back to port, Japanese destroyer  was bombed and sunk with no survivors by U.S. aircraft. The Japanese destroyer  was also crippled by a U.S. carrier aircraft attack during the battle and had to be scuttled by other, relatively undamaged Japanese destroyers. Suzutsuki was able to make it to Sasebo, Japan, despite her bow being blown off by steaming in reverse the entire way.

The remaining three less-damaged Japanese destroyers (Fuyutsuki, Yukikaze, and Hatsushimo) were able to rescue 280 survivors from Yamato (sources differ on the size of Yamatos crew, giving it as between 2,750 and 3,300 men), plus 555 survivors from Yahagi (out of a crew of 1,000) and just over 800 survivors from Isokaze, Hamakaze, and Kasumi. Between 3,700 and 4,250 Japanese naval personnel perished in the battle. The ships took the survivors to Sasebo.

A total of 10 U.S. aircraft were shot down by anti-aircraft fire from the Japanese ships; some aircrews were rescued by seaplane or submarine. In total, the U.S. lost 12 men. Some of the Japanese survivors reported that U.S. fighter aircraft strafed Japanese survivors floating in the water. Japanese survivors also reported that U.S. aircraft temporarily halted their attacks on the Japanese destroyers during the time that the destroyers were busy picking up survivors from the water.

Aerial kamikaze attacks
During the battle, as promised, the Japanese Army conducted an air attack on the U.S. naval fleet at Okinawa, but they failed to sink any ships. Around 115 aircraft—many of them kamikaze—attacked the U.S. ships throughout April 7. Kamikaze aircraft hit the aircraft carrier , battleship , and destroyer , causing moderate damage to Hancock and Maryland and severe damage to Bennett. About 100 Japanese aircraft were lost in the attack.

Aftermath
Ten-Go was the last major Japanese naval operation of the war, and the remaining Japanese warships had little involvement in combat operations for the rest of the conflict. Suzutsuki was never repaired. Fuyutsuki was repaired but hit a U.S. air-dropped mine at Moji, Japan, on 20 August 1945, and was not subsequently repaired. Yukikaze survived the war almost undamaged. Hatsushimo hit a U.S. air-dropped mine on 30 July 1945, near Maizuru, Japan, and was the 129th, and last, Japanese destroyer sunk in the war.

Maryland was kept out of the war following the kamikaze attacks. Okinawa was declared secure by Allied forces on 21 June 1945, after an intense and costly battle. Japan surrendered on 15 August 1945 after the atomic bombings of Hiroshima and Nagasaki and the USSR launching an invasion of Northern China and Korea. The apparent willingness of Japan to sacrifice so many of its people using suicidal tactics such as Operation Ten-Go and in the Battle of Okinawa was reportedly a factor in the American decision to employ atomic weapons against Japan.

Yamato remains fairly prominent in modern Japanese culture, where she is often portrayed as a symbol of Japanese nationalism. The academic Robert Farley has written that popular depictions of the battleship portray her destruction as a "heroic, but also pointless and futile, sacrifice". One of the reasons the event may have such significance in Japanese culture is that the word Yamato was often used as a poetic name for Japan. Thus, the end of the battleship Yamato could serve as a metaphor for the end of the Japanese empire.

References

Footnotes

Bibliography

Further reading

External links

  The official site of the NOVA documentary with additional information on the subject.

1945 in Japan
April 1945 events in Asia
Conflicts in 1945
Naval aviation operations and battles
Naval battles of World War II involving Japan
Naval battles of World War II involving the United States
Pacific Ocean theatre of World War II